Mint Velvet is a British womenswear clothing brand with boutiques across the UK and Ireland, as well as concessions in John Lewis, House of Fraser and Fenwick.

Relaxed Glamour is our fail-safe style formula: it underpins everything we do and has been with us since the very beginning.

History

Mint Velvet was founded in 2009 by Liz Houghton, Jane Rawlings, Lisa Agar-Rea and Stuart Grant after identifying their own needs and desires "to wear the trends in a relaxed way" and look effortlessly stylish, even on the busiest of days.

References

Clothing companies of the United Kingdom
British brands